The 2022 Conference USA Football Championship Game was a college football game played on December 2, 2022, at the Alamodome in San Antonio. It was the 18th edition of the Conference USA Football Championship Game and determined the champion of Conference USA (C–USA) for the 2022 season. The game began at 7:00 pm and aired on CBS Sports Network. The contest saw the host UTSA Roadrunners defeat the North Texas Mean Green 48–27 to claim the conference title for the second straight season. Sponsored by tax services and consulting firm Ryan LLC, the game was officially known as the Ryan Conference USA Football Championship Game.

This was the final C-USA game for both teams, which are joining the American Athletic Conference in July 2023.

Previous season

The 2021 Conference USA Football Championship Game featured UTSA against Western Kentucky. UTSA won 49–41.

Teams

North Texas

UTSA

Game summary

References

2022 Conference USA football season
Conference USA Football Championship Game
North Texas Mean Green football games
UTSA Roadrunners football games
American football competitions in San Antonio
Conference USA Football Championship Game
Conference USA Football Championship Game
21st century in San Antonio